Walter Vogt was a German embryologist. He lived from 1888 to 1941. He was the first scientist to use vital dye to do fate mapping. In 1929, he used vital dyes to construct fate maps of amphibian embryos.

References

German embryologists
1888 births
1941 deaths